Ailey is a crater on Mercury. It has a diameter of 21 kilometers. Its name was adopted by the International Astronomical Union (IAU) in on April 24, 2012. Ailey is named for the American dancer and choreographer Alvin Ailey, who lived from 1931 to 1989.

References

Impact craters on Mercury